Neustadt an der Donau is a town in Lower Bavaria on the Danube in Bavaria, Germany. Lying on the western border of Landkreis Kelheim, Neustadt is primarily known for the thermal spa Bad Gögging. Neustadt had a population of 12,753 as of December 31, 2003.

Geography
The rivers Ilm and Abens flow into the Danube in the city.

The township includes 22 districts Arresting, Bad Gögging, Deisenhofen, Eining, Geibenstetten, Haderfleck, Heiligenstadt, Hienheim, Irnsing, Irnsing-Steinbruch, Karpfenstein, Lina, Marching, Mauern, Mulhouse, Niederulrain, Oberulrain, Schwaig, Sittling, Umbertshausen and Wöhr .
The area heavily dominated by agriculture; asparagus and in particular hops play a special role.
Neighboring communities of Neustadt are Abensberg, Altmannstein, Biburg, Kelheim, Mindelstetten, Münchsmünster, Pförring and Siegenburg.

History 
The oldest documented area of Neustadt was the village of Trephenau. Under the name Seligenstadt  the town charter was granted in May 1273 by Duke Ludwig II.  This town charter is the oldest in Bavaria. With the town survey and the consequent new investment and resettlement Duke Ludwig II secured the Danube Valley road and the river crossing. The town charter is one of many granted by early Wittelsbach dukes as part of a planned foundation of towns.  Neustadt was first mentioned by that name in a document of Abbot Conrad of Weltenburg from 1277.

The settlement of Wöhr, just outside the city gate on the bank of the Danube, is actually older than Neustadt. The name derives from the Middle High German Wert, signifying an island of elevated dry land. Wöhr was incorporated in the late Middle Ages as part of the city of Neustadt and residents of Wöhr could be citizens of the city, but lived outside the fortification. Wöhr was also the seat of the noble family of the Lords of Wöhr and the ducal Urbar Office "ze Werde" that managed the natural and monetary levies from the ducal estates.

Population

Personalities 
 Eberhard of Salzburg (* around 1085 in Sittling-1164 in the Cistercian monastery Rein),  Archbishop of Salzburg from 1147 to 1164, was venerated as a holy
 Wilhelm Sander (died 1973 in Neustadt an der Donau), manufacturer and donor
 Jürgen Wittmann (born 1966 in Neustadt an der Donau), German football goalkeeper

References

External links 

 Municipal website
 Official website of Bad Gögging

Populated places on the Danube